Gary McClintock (born 1 January 1997) is an Irish cricketer. He made his List A debut for North West Warriors in the 2017 Inter-Provincial Cup on 1 May 2017. Prior to his List A debut, he was part of Ireland's squad for the 2016 Under-19 Cricket World Cup.

References

External links
 

1997 births
Living people
Irish cricketers
North West Warriors cricketers
Place of birth missing (living people)